Boudet is a French surname. Notable people with the surname include:

Jacques Boudet (born 1939), French actor
Jean Boudet (1769–1809), French general
Henri Boudet (1837–1915), French Catholic priest
Richard Boudet (1958–1995), French archaeologist

See also
Boudet Island, island of Antarctica

French-language surnames